Elizabeth Nicole "Liz" Jacobson (March 26, 1984September 28, 2005) was a United States Air Force airman who was killed in action in the Iraq War in 2005. A member of the U.S. Air Force Security Forces, she was the first female U.S. airman killed in the line of duty in support of Operation Iraqi Freedom and the first Air Force Security Forces member killed in conflict since the Vietnam War.

Early life and education
Jacobson was born and raised in Florida. 
She attended Palm Beach Gardens and Gold Coast high schools. and resided in the Riviera Beach area.

Career 
 

Jacobson enlisted in 2003 and was trained in Texas where she completed training in 2004 and was then posted to 17th Security Forces Squadron also based in Texas, her last posting was to Camp Bucca, Iraq in early 2005.

On September 28, 2005, while Jacobson was guarding a convoy originating from Camp Bucca, Iraq, the vehicle she was riding in was hit by an improvised explosive device near the Iraqi town of Safwan. The explosion killed her and U.S. Army sergeant Steve Morin Jr., 34 years old, from Arlington, Texas. A third soldier who was manning the vehicle's turret weapon was injured but survived the attack.

At the time of her death, she was assigned to the 17th Security Forces Squadron at Goodfellow Air Force Base, Texas and had deployed to Iraq as part of the 586th Expeditionary Security Forces Squadron. Jacobson had been in the Air Force for two years and had been deployed to Iraq for more than three months.

Jacobson is buried at the Forest Lawn Memorial Gardens in Pompano Beach, Florida.

Legacy 
The U.S. Air Force has established the Elizabeth N. Jacobson Award for Expeditionary Excellence which is given to airmen for outstanding performance during a deployment. A street on Ali Al Salem Air Base running from entry control point "Echo 4" to a South Korean air force compound was renamed Jacobson Avenue in her honor. Goodfellow Air Force Base renamed the base main gate Jacobson Gate The Eagle Chapter, Air Force Security Police Association, created a challenge coin to honor the memory of Jacobson. At Lackland Air Force Base there is the Jacobson Training Facility for Security Force Members and the Library in the facility has numerous mementos from Jacobson. The museum on the base also holds her in an honor position. The Travis AFB First Term Airman's Center is named after Jacobson.

Assignments 
 2003 – 2004, 17th Training Wing, Goodfellow Air Force Base, Texas
 2004 – 2005, 17th Security Forces Squadron, Goodfellow Air Force Base, Texas
 2005 – 2005, Camp Bucca, Iraq

Awards and decorations

References

External links 
 
 Elizabeth Nicole Jacobson at TogetherWeServed
 

1984 births
2005 deaths
Jewish American military personnel
American military personnel killed in the Iraq War
United States Air Force personnel of the Iraq War
Deaths by improvised explosive device in Iraq
Military personnel from Florida
People from Orlando, Florida
United States Air Force airmen
Women in the Iraq War
Female United States Air Force personnel